Bhusal or Bhushal is a surname belonging to the Khas people of both the Bahun and Chhetri caste from Nepal.

Notable people with the surname Bhusal include:
Beduram Bhusal, Nepalese politician
Deepak Bhusal, footballer from Nepal
Ghanashyam Bhusal, Nepali politician
Lalit Bhusal, British filmmaker of Nepalese descent
Pampha Bhusal, Nepali politician
Pushpa Bhusal Gautam, Nepali politician
Manohari Singh Bhusal, Indian musician of Nepalese origin.

References

Ethnic groups in Nepal
Nepali-language surnames
Khas surnames
Kshatriya communities
Brahmin communities